Kelly Willis is the third album from the Austin, Texas-based singer. There were a couple of minor Billboard hits in the #63 "Heaven's Just a Sin Away" (covering a 1977 #1 hit for The Kendalls) and the #72 "Whatever Way the Wind Blows." Also of note is a duet with Kevin Welch, "That'll Be Me."

Tony Brown produced the album, with co-production by Don Was and John Leventhal on the tracks "Get Real" and "Shadows of Love".

Track listing
"Take It All Out on You" (Bruce Robison, Mas Palermo) – 2:33
"Heaven's Just a Sin Away" (Jerry Gillespie) – 2:30
"One More Night" (Palermo, Charlie Robison) – 3:17
"That'll Be Me" [with Kevin Welch] (Kevin Welch) – 4:23
"Whatever Way the Wind Blows" (Marshall Crenshaw) – 3:23
"Get Real" (Kelly Willis, John Leventhal) – 2:56
"I Know Better Now" (Jim Lauderdale) – 3:48
"Up All Night" (Libby Dwyer) – 4:06
"World Without You" (Willis, Paul Kennerley) – 3:17
"Shadows of Love" (Willis, Leventhal) – 4:02

Personnel
 Richard Bennett - acoustic guitar
 Billy Bremner - electric guitar
 Dan Dugmore - steel guitar
 Andrew Gold - background vocals
 Mike Henderson - electric guitar, mandolin
 Jellyfish (band) - background vocals
 Kieran Kane - bouzouki, mandolin, background vocals
 Fats Kaplin - accordion, fiddle, flute
 John Leventhal - acoustic guitar, electric guitar, organ, percussion, piano
 Roger Joseph Manning Jr. - background vocals
 Jonell Mosser - background vocals
 Michael Rhodes - bass guitar
 Harry Stinson - drums, background vocals
 Andy Sturmer - background vocals
 Benmont Tench - keyboards
 Don Was - bass guitar
 Kevin Welch - acoustic guitar and duet vocals on "That'll Be Me"
 Kelly Willis - lead vocals, background vocals
 Glenn Worf - bass guitar

References 

Kelly Willis albums
1993 albums
Albums produced by Tony Brown (record producer)
Albums produced by Don Was
Albums produced by John Leventhal
MCA Records albums